This is a list of films produced by Embassy Pictures, an American independent film production and distribution studio.

Productions

 
Embassy